Gaston Cornereau (31 August 1888 – 5 July 1944) was a French fencer. He placed fourth in the individual épée competition at the 1924 Summer Olympics.

References

External links
 

1888 births
1944 deaths
French male épée fencers
Olympic fencers of France
Fencers at the 1924 Summer Olympics